Otok is a settlement on the southeastern shore of Lake Cerknica south of the town of Cerknica in the Inner Carniola region of Slovenia.

References

External links

Otok on Geopedia

Populated places in the Municipality of Cerknica